Kalateh-ye Nish Kesh (also Romanized as Kalāteh-ye Nīsh Kesh and Kalāteh-ye Nīsh Kīsh; also known as Nīsh Kash, Nīsh Kesh, and Nīshkish) is a village in Rezqabad Rural District, in the Central District of Esfarayen County, North Khorasan Province, Iran. At the 2006 census, its population was 62, in 15 families.

References 

Populated places in Esfarayen County